

251001–251100 

|-
| 251001 Sluch ||  || Sluch, a river that flows through Ukraine in the basin of the Dniper. || 
|-id=018
| 251018 Liubirena ||  || Liubov Grinishyn (born 1955) and Irene Malinovska (born 1967), Ukraine poets and lyric story writers, as well as amateur astronomers at the nearby Andrushivka Astronomical Observatory || 
|}

251101–251200 

|-bgcolor=#f2f2f2
| colspan=4 align=center | 
|}

251201–251300 

|-bgcolor=#f2f2f2
| colspan=4 align=center | 
|}

251301–251400 

|-id=325
| 251325 Leopoldjosefine ||  || Leopold Gierlinger (born 1935) and Josefine Gierlinger (born 1935), parents of German discoverer Richard Gierlinger || 
|}

251401–251500 

|-id=449
| 251449 Olexakorolʹ ||  || Oleksiy Kostyantynovych Korolʹ (1913–1977) worked in the Main Astronomical Observatory of the Academy of Sciences of Ukraine and was a member of IAU Commission No. 9. He obtained observations of celestial bodies to help solve problems in fundamental astrometry. || 
|}

251501–251600 

|-id=595
| 251595 Rudolfböttger ||  || Rudolf Christian Böttger (1806–1881), a German chemist and physicist at the Physical Society of Frankfurt am Main || 
|}

251601–251700 

|-id=621
| 251621 Lüthen ||  || Hartwig Lüthen (born 1960), associate professor of plant physiology at the University of Hamburg || 
|-id=625
| 251625 Timconrow ||  || Tim Conrow (born 1958), a senior engineer at the California Institute of Technology's Infrared Processing and Analysis Center || 
|-id=627
| 251627 Joyceearl ||  || Joyce (1920–2003) and Earl (1914–1979) Bonar, grandparents of American astronomer Amy Mainzer, the principal investigator of the space-based NEOWISE mission || 
|}

251701–251800 

|-bgcolor=#f2f2f2
| colspan=4 align=center | 
|}

251801–251900 

|-bgcolor=#f2f2f2
| colspan=4 align=center | 
|}

251901–252000 

|-bgcolor=#f2f2f2
| colspan=4 align=center | 
|}

References 

251001-252000